Robert Scheerer (December 28, 1929 – March 3, 2018) was an American film and television director, actor, and producer.

Scheerer was born in Santa Barbara, California, on December 28, 1929.

Scheerer's work in films began with his dancing, including  Mister Big (1943) and other films with the tap group The Jivin' Jacks and Jills. He also performed on television programs, including Dagmar's Canteen, Cavalcade of Stars, and Four Star Revue. On Broadway, he performed in The Boy Friend (1954), Top Banana (1951), Dance Me a Song (1950), and Lend an Ear (1948). He also was assistant to the choreographer for Tickets, Please! (1950).

Scheerer's more notable work includes directing Star Trek: The Next Generation, Star Trek: Deep Space Nine and Star Trek: Voyager. He has received three Emmy Award nominations for directing Fame. He received an Emmy Award for Best Director in 1964 for The Danny Kaye Show. He made his Broadway debut in the musical Lend an Ear in 1948, appearing with Carol Channing, Gene Nelson, and won a Theatre World Award for his performance for outstanding debut. Scheerer directed the 1980 crime-comedy film How to Beat the High Cost of Living, which starred Jessica Lange, Jane Curtin and Susan Saint James.

Scheerer died in Valley Village, California.

Filmography

Television (selection)
 Star Trek: Voyager: "Rise" (1997), "State of Flux" (1995)
 Star Trek: Deep Space Nine: "Shadowplay" (1994)
 Star Trek: The Next Generation (11 episodes)
 "Inheritance" (1993)
 "Chain of Command", Part I (1992)
 "True Q" (1992)
 "The Outcast" (1992)
 "New Ground" (1992)
 "Legacy" (1990)
 "Tin Man" (1990)
 "The Defector" (1990)
 "The Price" (1989)
 "Peak Performance" (1989)
 "The Measure of a Man" (1989)

In a 1992 interview, Scheerer said "I love to work with a script and an actor" and "On The Next Generation, the actors work hard, try things and are pleasant. The crew is hard-working and fun; we have a lot of laughs and they can really get down to work when they need to. That's what makes it a pleasure to do."

References

External links 
 

1929 births
2018 deaths
American male film actors
American male television actors
American television directors
American television producers
Film directors from California
People from Santa Barbara, California